Lake Bisina, also known as Lake Salisbury, is a freshwater lake in eastern Uganda. It is a satellite lake of Lake Kyoga, which it drains into, and the two are to some extent directly connected by papyrus swamps.

Conservation and ecology
Lake Bisina is one of Uganda's 33 Important Bird Areas and since 2006 a Ramsar-listed wetland of international importance.

The lake is important for fish, notably several threatened haplochromine cichlids like Haplochromis orthostoma, H. argenteus (appears to have disappeared from its main range in Lake Victoria), H. latifasciatus, H. lividus, H. martini (appears to have disappeared from its main range in Lake Victoria), H. maxillaris, H. nubilus, H. parvidens, H. phytophagus and a number of undescribed species. Although Nile perch was introduced to Lake Bisina in the early 1970s, recent surveys have not detected this species, which has been implicated in the extinctions of many haplochromine cichlids elsewhere. A few tilapia species have also been introduced to Lake Bisina and they are still present, along with the native Singida and Victoria tilapias. Other, more widespread fish species found in Lake Bisina include marbled lungfish, and various species of catfish, African tetras and elephantfish.

See also
Kapir Atiira, village located near Lake Bisina

References

Bisina
Ramsar sites in Uganda
Important Bird Areas of Uganda